Tatar or Tatarköy is a village in the Kovancılar District of Elazığ Province in Turkey. The village is populated by Kurds of the Izol tribe and had a population of 17 in 2021.

References

Villages in Kovancılar District
Kurdish settlements in Elazığ Province